Finnish Institute in Tallinn is a non-profit organization, which headquarters are located in Tallinn, Estonia. The institute's goals are to maintain, develop, and strengthen Finnish–Estonian cultural cooperation in different fields of art, education, and society. The institute is maintained by the Foundation of the Finnish Institute in Estonia.

The institute was found in 1991.

The institute has also premises in Tartu.

The institute belongs to Finnish Cultural and Academic Institutes.

Directors
 Seppo Zetterberg (1994–1996)
 Juhani Salokannel (1997–2000)
 Martti Turtola (2001–2004)
 Jaana Vasama (2005–2009)
 Riitta Heinämaa (2010–2014)
 Anu Laitila (2015–2018)
 Anu Heinonen (2019–2021)
 Hannele Valkeeniemi (2021–)

References

External links
 

Estonia–Finland relations
Tallinn